This list of pharmaceutical compound number prefixes provides codes used by individual pharmaceutical companies when naming their pharmaceutical drug candidates. Pharmaceutical companies generally produce large numbers of compounds in the research phase for which it is impractical to use often long and cumbersome systematic chemical names, and for which the effort to generate nonproprietary names may not be warranted, see article on drug nomenclature. Instead, these compounds are usually given a number for internal reference at the company.  To distinguish the numbered compounds from different companies (or academic laboratories), each compound number is prefixed with a letter code indicating the company that developed the compound, that claims intellectual property on that compound etc. The letter code is conceived by companies themselves who should be interested in creating a unique code. Three main methods are found for prefixing the numeric identifier – with a space (gap), with nothing (concatenated), and with a dash (or hyphen).

For example, ABT-199 is a compound developed at Abbott Laboratories, and this name has been used in early publications of research results. Later the compound was assigned the international nonproprietary name (INN) venetoclax. Similarly, other compounds may be given a USAN or BAN for example. Finally, the compound may be given a trade name for example for marketing purposes.

A long list of code designations with corresponding trade names can be found in Appendix IV of the USP Dictionary, see article on drug nomenclature.

Note that this convention of composing compound identifiers from a company identifier followed by a number is not always followed. For example, the letter code may reflect a therapeutic/disease area or an internal project name. A randomly picked example is SC for spinal cord injury.

A to F
A •– Abbott Laboratories now AbbVie 
ABT – Abbott Laboratories now AbbVie 
ABBV – AbbVie
ACP – Acadia Pharmaceuticals
ACH - Achillion
ACZ – Novartis
ADL – Adolor Corporation
AG – Agouron Pharmaceuticals, now Pfizer La Jolla Labs
AH – Amersham plc (Amersham Health)
AHR – A.H. Robins
ALS – Alantos Pharmaceuticals, acquired by Amgen in June 2007
ALXN - Alexion
ANX – Adventrx Pharmaceuticals
AMG – Amgen
ARQ – ArQule
ARRY Array BioPharma 
ASP – Astellas Pharma
ATB - Antibe Therapeutics
ATL – Antisense Therapeutics Limited, Australia
AVXS – AveXis, in May 2018 acquired by Novartis
AY – Ayerst, later Wyeth-Ayerst, ultimately acquired by Pfizer
AZD – AstraZeneca
BAN – BioArctic Neuroscience AB, Sweden
BAY – Bayer AG
BB – Bluebird Bio
BCX – Laboratoires Biocodex
BI - Boehringer Ingelheim
BIIB – Biogen
BMS – Bristol-Myers Squibb
BMY – Bristol-Myers Co., merging in 1989 into Bristol-Myers Squibb
BRL – Beecham Research Labs, merged with SmithKline into SmithKline Beecham which merged into GlaxoSmithKline
BTC – The Boots Company plc
C – Laboratoires Cassenne
CAM – Cambridge Antibody Technology, acquired by AstraZeneca
CAS – Cassella Farbwerke Mainkur Aktiengesellschaft, later Hoechst, later Sanofi
CAT – Cannasat Therapeutics Inc., renamed 2010 Cynapsus Therapeutics
CAT – Cambridge Antibody Technology, acquired by AstraZeneca
CC – Celgene
CE – Pfizer
CGS – Ciba Geigy
CP – Pfizer.  CP refers to C. P. Pharmaceuticals, a subsidiary of Pfizer 
CSL – CSL Limited, an Australian biopharmaceutical company
CVX – CovX, acquired by Pfizer in 2008
CYT – Cytopia of Australia, acquired by YM Biosciences, subsequently by Gilead Sciences
D – Draco division of Astra AB, now AstraZeneca
DMP – DuPont Merck Pharmaceuticals, a joint venture between DuPont and Merck; became DuPont Pharmaceuticals in 1998
DPC – DuPont Pharmaceuticals, acquired by Bristol-Myers Squibb in 2001
DS -  Daiichi Sankyo
DX – Dyax
EAG – Eagle Pharmacy, a United States pharmaceutical compounding company  
EIDD – Emory Institute for Drug Development
EMD – Merck KGaA (E. Merck), Darmstadt, Germany (refers to laboratory founder Emanuel Merck in Darmstadt)
ETC – Esperion Therapeutics, acquired by Pfizer in 2003, independent again since 2008
F – Forest Labs, acquired by Actavis
FCE – Farmitalia-Carlo Erba, later Pharmacia AB, later Pharmacia & Upjohn, acquired by Pfizer
FF – Fujifilm
FG – FibroGen
FK – Fermentek
FS – F-star

G to L
G – J. R. Geigy AG, ultimately merged into Novartis
G – Genta Inc.
GDC – Genentech Likely Genentech Development Candidate 
GEH – GE Healthcare
GNE – Genentech internal reference number, company pipeline uses GDC- prefixes 
GP – Geigy, merged with CIBA in 1971 to become Ciba-Geigy, now Novartis
GR – GlaxoSmithKline
GS – Gilead Sciences
GS – Gesynta Pharma
GSK – GlaxoSmithKline
H – Hässle division of Astra AB, now AstraZeneca
HCV – ViroPharma
HOE – Hoechst AG
ICI – Imperial Chemical Industries, acquired by AkzoNobel and merged into Zeneca Group by the merger of the pharmaceutical operations. Now part of AstraZeneca
IDN – Idun Pharmaceuticals, acquired by Pfizer
ILY – Ilypsa, acquired by Amgen in 2007
INNO – CytRx
IPI – Infinity Pharmaceuticals, Inc
ISIS – Isis Pharmaceuticals (renamed Ionis Pharmaceuticals in 2015)
JNJ – Johnson & Johnson
KOS – Kosan Biosciences
KPT – Karyopharm Therapeutics
KU – KuDOS Pharmaceuticals
KW – Kyowa Hakko
L – Labaz Group, acquired by Elf Aquitaine in 1973 to form Sanofi
LU – Lundbeck
LY – Eli Lilly

M to S
MCN – McNeil Laboratories, now part of Johnson & Johnson
MDCO – The Medicines Company
MDL – Merrell Dow Pharmaceuticals
MEDI – MedImmune, acquired by AstraZeneca
MEM – Memory Pharmaceuticals
MGX – Victory Pharma
MK – Merck & Co. (Merck Sharp & Dohme)
MLN – Millennium Pharmaceuticals
MT – Micromet, acquired by Amgen in 2012
NBI – Neurocrine Biosciences
NC – Nycomed
NC – Nippon Chemiphar
NCX – NicOx
NG – Neurogen Corp.
NKTR – Nektar Therapeutics 
NVS – Novartis
OGX – OncoGenex
OPC – Otsuka Pharmaceutical Co.
OSI – OSI Pharmaceuticals
PD – Parke-Davis, now Pfizer
PF – Pfizer
PHA – Pharmacia, now Pfizer
PNU – Pharmacia & Upjohn, now Pfizer
PT – Pearl Therapeutics, now part of AstraZeneca
PTI – Proteostasis Therapeutics Inc
R – Janssen Pharmaceutica, now part of Johnson & Johnson (Janssen began as Belgian and Dutch distributor for products of Gedeon Richter Plc.)
RDEA – Ardea Biosciences acquired by AstraZeneca
RDX – Ardelyx
RXC - Redx Pharma
REGN – Regeneron Pharmaceuticals
RLY – Relypsa
RMI – Richardson-Merrell
RO – Hoffmann–La Roche
RP – ReceptorPharma
RTI– Research Triangle Institute (mostly restricted to various phenyltropanes)
RU – Roussel Uclaf
RWJ – R.W. Johnson Pharmaceutical Research, now part of Johnson & Johnson
SAGE – Sage Therapeutics
SAN – Sandoz Pharmaceuticals, now Novartis
SB – SmithKline Beecham, now GlaxoSmithKline
SC – G.D. Searle, now Pfizer
SCH – Schering Corp., later Schering-Plough
SKF – Smith, Kline & French, later merged into GlaxoSmithKline
SLV – Solvay
SNS – Sunesis Pharmaceuticals
SNS – Sensei Biotherapeutics
SPD – Shire
SPI – Spectrum Pharmaceuticals
SU – CIBA Pharmaceutical Company (the Summit, NJ site)
SU – SUGEN, now Pfizer

T to Z
TAK – Takeda
TC – Targacept Inc.
TERN – Terns Pharma
TG – Tragara Pharmaceuticals Inc., San Diego, CA
TH – Threshold Pharmaceuticals Inc.
TKS – Thiakis Limited, a UK biotech company (acquired by Wyeth in 2008).
TM – TransMolecular
TMC – Tibotec
TNP – Takeda Neosplastic Product, from Takeda Pharmaceutical Company
TNX – Tanox, now Genentech/Roche
TS – Taisho Pharmaceutical Co., a Japanese Pharmaceutical Company
U – Upjohn (merged with Pharmacia 1995)
UCL – University College London
UK – Pfizer Sandwich, UK
USL – Upsher-Smith Laboratories
UTETM - University of Utah
VET – Veterna S.r.l.
VX – Vertex Pharmaceuticals
WAY – Wyeth (Wyeth-Ayerst, acquired by Pfizer in 2009)
WY – Wyeth (merged with Ayerst 1987) 
XL – Exelixis
XTL – XTL Biopharmaceuticals
XU – Sandoz Pharmaceuticals, now Novartis
ZD – Zeneca, now AstraZeneca
ZS – ZS Pharma, acquired by AstraZeneca

References

Drug-related lists